Central Pueblo, Colorado used to be a city in Colorado. It was incorporated 1882.  It was one of 4 towns, South Pueblo, Colorado, Central Pueblo, Colorado, Bessemer. Colorado, and Pueblo, Colorado. South Pueblo, Colorado, and Central Pueblo were briefly consolidated as the City of Pueblo between March 9 and April 6 of 1886 It wasn't until 1894 when Bessemer city joined  to create the modern city of Pueblo, Colorado.

References

Geography of Pueblo County, Colorado